The Battle of Vaasa was fought between the Kingdom of Sweden and the Russian Empire during the Finnish War (1808-1809).

While the Swedish army was celebrating its victory at Nykarleby, another Swedish force, led by Johan Bergenstråhle, landed at Vaasa. Adlercreutz had forgot about this landing and didn't send any troops to help Bergenstråhle. The Swedes, numbering 1,300–1,400 men, landed just outside Vaasa, but the Russians, strengthened by the arrival of the Russian main army turned out to be too strong. After some harsh street battles, the Russians lost 37 killed, 82–113 wounded (five officers) and, according to certain sources, 53 captured; in total 150–172 men. The Swedes had lost 68 men killed and 204 captured (including the commander); of these, 101 men were wounded. The remaining forces retreated northwards, to the Swedish main army at Nykarleby, and created the Sixth [Swedish] brigade.

Russian forces 
Infantry (1,488)
Cossacks (200)
Guns (4)

In total: 1,688 men and 4 guns

Swedish forces 
Västerbotten Infantry Regiment (1 battalion)
Västerbotten auxiliary reserve and Jämtland Infantry Regiment (1 battalion; including 2 Jämtland companies)
Peasants (200–300)
Guns (4)

In total: 1,300–1,400 men and 4 guns

References

Sources

Vaasa
Vaasa
Vaasa
Vaasa
History of Ostrobothnia (region)
June 1808 events